Georgian church may refer to:

Georgian Orthodox Church
Catholic Church in Georgia, or Georgian Byzantine-Rite Catholics

See also
Georgian Orthodox Church in Armenia